The Striegis is a river of Saxony, Germany. It is a left tributary of the Freiberger Mulde, which it joins in Niederstriegis.

See also
List of rivers of Saxony

Rivers of Saxony
Rivers of the Ore Mountains
Rivers of Germany